Leslie Jack Phillips (20 January 1899 – 22 April 1979) was an English cricketer.  Phillips was a right-handed batsman who bowled slow left-arm orthodox.  He was born at Leyton, Essex.

Phillips made his first-class debut for Essex against Surrey in the 1919 County Championship.  He made three further first-class appearances for the county, the last of which came against Dublin University in 1922.  He scored a total of 38 runs in these four matches at an average of 9.50, with a high score of 19.

He died at Woodford Wells, Essex on 22 April 1979.

References

External links
Leslie Phillips at ESPNcricinfo
Leslie Phillips at CricketArchive

1899 births
1979 deaths
People from Leyton
English cricketers
Essex cricketers